Campbell Valley is an ice-filled valley, or pass, extending east–west between the main group of peaks of the Crary Mountains and Boyd Ridge, in Marie Byrd Land. It was mapped by the United States Geological Survey from ground surveys and from U.S. Navy air photos, 1959–66, and named by the Advisory Committee on Antarctic Names for Wallace H. Campbell, ionospheric physicist at McMurdo Station in the 1964–65 season, and at Macquarie Island, 1961–62.

References
 

Valleys of Antarctica
Landforms of Marie Byrd Land
Crary Mountains